Salit or Sal'it may refer to:

Sal'it, Israeli settlement
Givat Sal'it, Israeli outpost
Salit (name)